Bally's Chicago is an upcoming casino resort that will be built in the city of Chicago, Illinois, United States. In May 2022, Mayor Lori Lightfoot approved Bally's Corporation's bid to construct a casino complex in the city. The complex will be located in the city's River West neighborhood on the bank of the North Branch of the Chicago River, near the intersection of Chicago Avenue and Halsted Street. The plan was approved by the Chicago City Council in May 2022.

Background 

In the 2019 mayoral election, the topic of constructing a casino in the city was a main subject to then-mayoral candidates Lori Lightfoot and Toni Preckwinkle with both signaling their approval for the project. The prospect of a casino location in Chicago predated the election with Illinois overseeing construction of gambling locations in areas outside of Chicago.

Legislation expanding gambling in Illinois was passed by the state legislature at the start of June 2019 and signed by Governor J. B. Pritzker. However this bill did not approve the construction of a casino. Shortly afterwards, Lightfoot announced that the city would commence study of where a Chicago casino would be located. Lightfoot's predecessors had long sought to obtain a casino for the city. 

In November 2019 a gaming bill proposed by Pritzker failed to be passed in the Illinois Legislature due to a veto session. Lightfoot cited that the bill's failed proposal would not impact the construction plans, however cited that the casino's potential revenue would greatly impact the city's budget and capital bill. She continued to push, however, for the state to authorize a casino jointly owned by the city and state and with a lesser effective tax rate than the passed legislation specified. The goal for a casino construction was to establish a $200 million in annual tax revenue from the casino to fund police and firefighter pension funds.

Bidding process 

In April 2021, Lightfoot announced the beginning of the bidding process for the city's "casino-resort". She stated that proposals must include plans for a 500-room hotel, meeting space, restaurants, bars and entertainment venues.

In November 2021, Lightfoot announced the city's top five bids for a Chicago casino. She set a public meeting for the proposals for December 16, 2021. 

In March 2022, the three final bidding proposals were announced. The first was from Rush Street Gaming, which would cost USD $1.62 billion and would be built between the South Loop and Chinatown along the Chicago River. The second was a USD $1.74 billion proposal from the eventual chosen Bally's Corporation to build the casino and resort on the Chicago Tribune printing plant in the River West neighborhood. The final proposal was a $1.74 billion proposal from Hard Rock to build the casino and resort, across from Soldier Field.

On May 5, 2022, Lightfoot announced that she had selected the bid from the Bally's Corporation. The proposal still needs city council approval and Illinois Gaming Board approval. Reaction to the casino selection was controversial with many residents living near the proposed site.

Casino details 

When the Bally's Corporation sought their bid, they proposed a $1.6 billion casino and resort, where the current Chicago Tribune Publishing Center is located. Bally's has the option to buy the 30-acre site. The corporation has a plan to retrofit the former warehouse at the current Tribune plant in order to serve as a temporary casino while the casino is being built.

The first phase of the process would cost $1 billion, which would include 2,700 slot machines, 95 table games, a suite-only hotel, with 100 suites. There would also be an outdoor music venue with space for 1,000 people. After having a 20% return on investment from phase 1, Bally's would have a $600 million expansion. There would be a total of 4,000 gaming seats with the expansion, a new 400 room hotel, a 3000 seat indoor venue, and a 20,000 sq ft exhibition space. The temporary casino will be located at Medinah Temple at 600 N. Wabash Ave.

The permanent location will include a 3,000 seat theater, an extension of the Chicago Riverwalk, pedestrian bridge, six restaurants, a food hall, and room for 3,400 slots and 173 game tables.

Location 
A casino location was proposed on the south street of the McCormick Place near Lake Shore Drive. This proposal was rejected by the Chicago City Council in March 2022. The James R. Thompson Center was also discussed as a possible casino venue.

In May 2022, the location of the casino and resort was announced and would be located in the River West neighborhood. The temporary location will open in mid-2023 with the permanent location opening in 2026.

References

External links 
 

Casinos in Illinois
Unbuilt casinos